The Mars Observer spacecraft, also known as the Mars Geoscience/Climatology Orbiter, was a robotic space probe launched by NASA on September 25, 1992, to study the Martian surface, atmosphere, climate and magnetic field.  During the interplanetary cruise phase, communication with the spacecraft was lost on August 21, 1993, three days prior to orbital insertion.  Attempts to re-establish communication with the spacecraft were unsuccessful.

Mission background

History 
In 1984, a high priority mission to Mars was set forth by the Solar System Exploration Committee.  Then titled the Mars Geoscience/Climatology Orbiter, the Martian orbiter was planned to expand on the information already gathered by the Viking program. Preliminary mission goals expected the probe to provide planetary magnetic field data, detection of certain spectral line signatures of minerals on the surface, images of the surface at 1 meter/pixel and global elevation data.

Mars Observer was originally planned to be launched in 1990 by a Space Shuttle Orbiter.  The possibility for an expendable rocket to be used was also suggested, if the spacecraft was designed to meet certain constraints. On March 12, 1987, the mission was rescheduled for launch in 1992, in lieu of other backlogged missions (Galileo, Magellan, Ulysses) after the Space Shuttle Challenger disaster. Along with a launch delay, budget overruns necessitated the elimination of two instruments to meet the 1992 planned launch. As the development matured, the primary science objectives were finalized as:
Determine the global elemental and mineralogical character of the surface material.
Define globally the topography and gravitational field.
Establish the nature of the Martian magnetic field.
Determine the temporal and spatial distribution, abundance, sources, and sinks of volatiles and dust over a seasonal cycle.
Explore the structure and circulation of the atmosphere.

The program's total cost is estimated at $813 million.

Spacecraft design 

Its bus measured 1.1 meters tall, 2.2 meters wide, and 1.6 meters deep. The spacecraft was based on previous satellite designs, originally intended and developed to orbit Earth. The RCA AS-4000 Ku-band satellite design was used extensively for the spacecraft bus, propulsion, thermal protection, and solar array. RCA TIROS and DMSP Block 50-2 satellite designs were also utilized in the implementing the Attitude and Articulation Control System (AACS), command and data handling subsystem, and power subsystem, into Mars Observer. Other elements such as the bipropellant components and high-gain antenna were designed specifically for the mission.

Attitude control and propulsion 
The spacecraft was three-axis stabilized with four reaction wheels and twenty-four thrusters with 1,346 kilograms of propellant. Of the bipropellant thrusters, four located on the aft, provide 490 newtons of thrust for course corrections, control of the spacecraft during the Mars orbital insertion maneuver and large orbit corrections during the mission; another four, located on along the sides of the spacecraft, provide 22 newtons for controlling roll maneuvers. Of the hydrazine thrusters, eight provide 4.5 newtons to control orbit trim maneuvers; another eight provide 0.9 newtons for offsetting, or "desaturating", the reaction wheels. To determine the orientation of the spacecraft, a horizon sensor, a 6-slit star scanner, and five sun sensors were included.

Communications 

For telecommunications, the spacecraft included a two-axis gimbaled 1.5 meter, parabolic high-gain antenna, mounted to a 6 meter boom to communicate with the Deep Space Network across the X-band using two GFP NASA X-band transponders (NXTs) and two GFP command detector units (CDUs). An assembly of six low-gain antennas, and a single medium-gain antenna were also included, to be used during the cruise phase while the high-gain antenna remained stowed, and for contingency measures should communications through the high-gain antenna become restricted. When broadcasting to the Deep Space Network, a maximum of 10.66 kilobytes/second could be achieved while the spacecraft could receive commands at a maximum bandwidth of 62.5 bytes/second.

Power 
Power was supplied to the spacecraft through a six panel solar array, measuring 7.0 meters wide and 3.7 meters tall, and would provide an average of 1,147 watts when in orbit. To power the spacecraft while occluded from the Sun, two 42 A·h nickel-cadmium batteries were included; the batteries would recharge as the solar array received sunlight.

Computer 
The computing system on the spacecraft was a retooling of the system used on the TIROS and DMSP satellites. The semiautonomous system was able to store up to 2,000 commands in the included 64 kilobytes of random-access memory, and execute them at a maximum rate of 12.5 commands/second; commands could also provide sufficient autonomous operation of the spacecraft for up to sixty days. To record data, redundant digital tape recorders (DTR) were included and each capable of storing up to 187.5 megabytes, for later playback to the Deep Space Network.

Scientific instruments

Mission profile

Launch and trajectory 
Mars Observer was launched on September 25, 1992, at 17:05:01 UTC by the National Aeronautics and Space Administration from Space Launch Complex 40 at the Cape Canaveral Air Force Station in Florida, aboard a Commercial Titan III CT-4 launch vehicle. The complete burn sequence lasted for 34 minutes after a solid-fuel Transfer Orbit Stage  placed the spacecraft into an 11-month, Mars transfer trajectory, at a final speed of 5.28 km/s with respect to Mars.

On August 25, 1992, particulate contamination was found within the spacecraft. After a full inspection, a cleaning was determined necessary and was performed on August 29. The suspected cause of the contamination were measures taken to protect the spacecraft prior to the landfall of Hurricane Andrew which struck the coast of Florida on August 24.

Encounter with Mars 
Mars Observer was scheduled to perform an orbital insertion maneuver on August 24, 1993, but contact with the spacecraft was lost on August 21, 1993. The likely reason for the spacecraft failure was the leakage of fuel and oxidizer vapors through the improperly designed PTFE check valve to the common pressurization system. During interplanetary cruise, the vapor mix had accumulated in feed lines and pressurant lines, resulting in explosion and their rupture after the engine was restarted for routine course correction. A similar problem later crippled the Akatsuki space probe in 2010. Although none of the primary objectives were achieved, the mission provided interplanetary cruise phase data, collected up to the date of last contact. This data would be useful for subsequent missions to Mars. Science instruments originally developed for Mars Observer were placed on four subsequent spacecraft to complete the mission objectives: Mars Global Surveyor launched in 1996, Mars Climate Orbiter launched in 1998, 2001 Mars Odyssey launched in 2001 and Mars Reconnaissance Orbiter launched in 2005.

Intended operations 

On August 24, 1993, Mars Observer would turn 180-degrees and ignite the bipropellant thrusters to slow the spacecraft, entering into a highly elliptical orbit. Over the next three months, subsequent "transfer to lower orbit" (TLO) maneuvers would be performed as the spacecraft reached periapsis, eventually resulting in an approximately circular, 118-minute orbit around Mars.

The primary mission was to begin on November 23, 1993, collecting data during one Martian year (approximately 687 Earth days). The first global map was expected to be completed on December 16, followed by solar conjunction beginning on December 20, and lasting for nineteen days, ending on January 3, 1994; during this time, mission operations would be suspended as radio contact would not be possible.

Orbiting Mars at an approximate speed of 3.4 km/s, the spacecraft would travel around Mars in a north to south, polar orbit. As the spacecraft circles the planet, horizon sensors indicate the orientation of the spacecraft while the reaction wheels would maintain the orientation of the instruments, towards Mars. The chosen orbit was also sun-synchronous, allowing the daylit side of Mars to always be captured during the mid-afternoon of each Martian Sol. While some instruments could provide a real-time data link when Earth was in view of the spacecraft, data would also be recorded to the digital tape recorders and played back to Earth each day. Over 75 gigabytes of scientific data was expected to be yielded during the primary mission, much more than any previous mission to Mars. The end of the operable life for the spacecraft was expected to be limited by the supply of propellant and the condition of the batteries.

Communications loss 

On August 21, 1993, at 01:00 UTC, three days prior to the scheduled Mars orbital insertion, there was an "inexplicable" loss of contact with Mars Observer. New commands were sent every 20 minutes in the hopes that the spacecraft had drifted off course and could regain contact. However, the attempt was unsuccessful. It is unknown whether the spacecraft was able to follow its automatic programming and go into Mars orbit or if it flew by Mars and is now in a heliocentric orbit.

On January 4, 1994, an independent investigation board from the Naval Research Laboratory, announced their findings: the most probable cause in the loss of communication was a rupture of the fuel pressurization tank in the spacecraft's propulsion system. It is believed that hypergolic fuel may have leaked past valves in the system during the cruise to Mars, allowing the fuel and oxidizer to combine prematurely before reaching the combustion chamber.  The leaking fuel and gas probably resulted in a high spin rate, causing the spacecraft to enter into the "contingency mode"; this interrupted the stored command sequence and did not turn the transmitter on. The engine was derived from one belonging to an Earth orbital satellite and was not designed to lie dormant for months before being fired.

Aftermath 
The Mars Exploration Program was formed officially in the wake of the Mars Observer's failure in September 1993. The goals of that program include identifying the location of water, and preparing for crewed missions to Mars.

See also 

 Exploration of Mars
 List of missions to Mars
 Planetary Observer program
 Space exploration
 Unmanned space missions

References

External links 
Mars Observer launch press kit 
Mars Observer Mission Profile by NASA's Solar System Exploration
Mars Observer at NSSDC Master Catalog
The Loss of Mars Observer at Malin Space Science Systems. 
NASA – Mars Observer

NASA space probes
Derelict satellites in heliocentric orbit
Missions to Mars
Spacecraft launched in 1992
Articles containing video clips
Space accidents and incidents in the United States